East Side Story may refer to:

Film and television 
East Side Story, a 1988 film featuring Marc Anthony
East Side Story, a 1991 episode of the American TV series Beverly Hills, 90210
East Side Story (1997 film), a 1997 German documentary
East Side Story (2006 film), a 2006 romantic comedy
"East Side Story" (Ugly Betty), a 2007 episode of the American TV series Ugly Betty
"East Side Story", an episode of the American TV series  Will & Grace
East Side Stories, a 2012 Hungarian film

Music 
East Side Story (Squeeze album)
East Side Story (Kid Frost album)
East Side Story (Emily King album)
"East Side Story" (Bob Seger song), 1966
"East Side Story", a song by Bryan Adams from Room Service
 East Side Story, an American band including Ron Lauback
 an influential series of soul-music compilations affiliated with Lowrider culture

Literature 
East Side Story, a 2004 novel by Louis Auchincloss

Theatre 
An early name for West Side Story used when it still took place in the Lower East Side about a Jewish girl (that became Maria), and an Irish Catholic boy (that became Tony)

Science 
A theory, associated with Yves Coppens, of human evolution in East Africa. Also known as the "Rift Valley theory".

See also
West Side Story (disambiguation)
Southside Story (disambiguation)